Rasht Technical and Vocational Institute - Shahid Chamran ( or Technical and Vocational University of Rasht) is one of the oldest higher educational institutes [Technological Institute] which was established in Rasht, Iran in 1967 (1346 H). It started its activities with 700 students who graduated from technical high schools and mostly studied in the fields of engineering. Today this institute is considered as one of the most crowded technical and vocational institutions in Iran with over 2400 students in nine different faculties.

This institute is an important branch of the Technical and Vocational University in Iran.

Faculties
 Department of Electric Power Engineering
 Department of Electronics Engineering
 Department of Computer Engineering
 Department of Textile Engineering
 Department of Civil Engineering
 Department of Architecture
 Department of Industrial Drawing
 Department of Utilities & Engineering
 Department of Accounting

Majors
 Bachelor in Construction Technology
 Bachelor in Textile Technology
 Bachelor in IT Technology
 Bachelor in Utilities & Engineering
 Bachelor in Electronics Engineering Technology
 Associate in Computer Science - Software
 Associate in Computer Science - Hardware
 Associate in Electronics
 Associate in Electrotechnics - Industrial Power
 Associate in Electrical & Utilities
 Associate in Accounting Business - Accounting
 Associate in Civil - Building
 Associate in Architectural Drafting - Architecture
 Associate in Traditional Architectural Drafting
 Associate in Textile Industry - Textile Industry
 Associate in Utilities - Heating and Air Conditioning
 Associate in Utilities - Gas

References

External links

Education in Iran
Rasht
Technical and Vocational University